Salt Springs is an unincorporated community in Saline County, in the U.S. state of Missouri.

History
A post office called Salt Springs was established in 1875, and remained in operation until 1907. The community was so named on account of brine springs near the original town site.

References

Unincorporated communities in Saline County, Missouri
Unincorporated communities in Missouri